Lobo Blanco or White Wolf was a Jicarilla Apache chief of the band that, with 30 warriors, raided the horse herd of the Second Regiment of Dragoons at Fort Union, and, reached up near the Canadian River, was defeated by Lieutenant Bell's Dragoon detachment in the Battle of Canadian River on April 4, 1854, before the Battle of Cieneguilla; repeatedly wounded, the chief was finally killed crushing him under a boulder.

References

Jicarilla Apache people
Apache Wars
Native American leaders
Native American people of the Indian Wars
19th-century Native Americans